Pi Kappa Alpha, commonly known as PIKE, is a college fraternity founded at the University of Virginia in 1868. The fraternity has over 225 chapters and colonies across the United States and abroad with over 15,500 undergraduate members and over 300,000 lifetime initiates.

History

Pi Kappa Alpha was founded on March 1, 1868, in Room 47 in West Range (The Range) at the University of Virginia by six graduate students: 

Three of the Founders had been former cadets, having served on both sides of the recently concluded Civil War. One had been a Union hospital officer, another a Confederate veteran, and a third, a repatriate.  Expansion was considered early in the fraternity's history; on March 1, 1869, exactly one year after the Alpha chapter at the University of Virginia was formed, the Beta chapter of Pi Kappa Alpha was founded at Davidson College. Its Gamma chapter was placed at William and Mary just two years later, and a total of seven chapters formed in the first decade. This period of early growth slowed though, and by 1889 only four chapters remained active.

A call for a national convention was sent out, and delegates of three of the four active chapters met in what would become the "junior founding" of the fraternity at what they called the Hampden–Sydney Convention, held in a dorm room at Hampden–Sydney College. This marked the start of a new wave of prosperity and substantial growth and the end of almost a decade of decline. Theta chapter, at Rhodes College, took over the responsibilities of Alpha chapter, granting chapters for a short period before this duty was taken over by an administrative office. John Shaw Foster, a junior founder from Theta chapter, helped to reestablish Alpha chapter at the University of Virginia. Theta chapter is the longest continual running chapter of Pi Kappa Alpha, having been founded in 1878.  The four delegates to the Hampden–Sydney Convention are referred to as the Junior Founders.

Pi Kappa Alpha was not originally organized as a sectional fraternity; however, by constitutional provision it became so in 1889, and for twenty years would only open chapters south of the Mason-Dixon Line.

Pi Kappa Alpha members have supported the nation's armed conflicts in large numbers. In World War I, one out of every six members of the fraternity served in uniform. In World War II, 15,000 of its 33,000 active members served, including General Courtney Hodges, a four-star general and commander of the US First Army in Europe.

Sectarian and other restrictions that were in place during the early years have since been modified or removed entirely: Pi Kappa Alpha remained a southern fraternity until the New Orleans Convention in 1909 when the fraternity officially declared itself a national organization. Like many other social fraternities at the time, Pi Kappa Alpha had limited its membership to white males. All race restrictions were removed in 1964.

Rituals
The fraternity's rituals were based on those of Independent Order of Odd Fellows.

Shield & Diamond
Shield & Diamond is the official quarterly publication of Pi Kappa Alpha. It was first printed in December 1890 by Robert Adger Smythe, the then Grand Secretary and Treasurer, under the name The Pi Kappa Alpha Journal. The name was changed to Shield & Diamond in 1891.

Foundation and educational programs

PIKE University

Pike University is the name used for all of the fraternity's leadership programs. The program is administered by the fraternity's professional staff.

Founded in 1948 as a 501(c)(3) tax-exempt organization for charitable, literary & educational purposes. Events held by the university include International Convention, the Academy, the Chapter Executives Conference, and several regional Leadership Summits. Pike University grants more than $100,000 in scholarships each year.

The PIKE Foundation

In 1948, Pi Kappa Alpha established and chartered the "Pi Kappa Alpha Memorial Foundation" as a 501(c)(3) organization. The foundation grants $350,000 in scholarships and grants to undergraduate members each year. It also provides funding to the fraternity and its chapters for leadership programs, scholarships, and chapter house facilities. The foundation grants initiation fee scholarships to undergraduates inducted into Phi Beta Kappa, Omicron Delta Kappa, Order of Omega, Phi Kappa Phi, and Tau Beta Pi honoraries. The Pike Foundation also maintains and operates the Memorial Headquarters in Memphis, Tennessee. This facility houses professional staffs, the Harvey T. Newell Library, and the Freeman Hart Museum. The building is a war memorial built in 1988 to recognize the military services of members who died in the line of duty. A Gold Star Memorial was dedicated on August 1, 2008.

Local chapter misconduct
Despite policies put in place by the national fraternity to curtail hazing behavior, local chapters have been involved in events which lead to deaths, sexual assault, and other misconduct.

Deaths
Notable examples of misconduct which led to death include:
The 1976 death of Samuel Mark Click, a pledge at Texas Tech University who was killed by a train while participating in a scavenger hunt as part of a hazing event.
In 2002, Albert Santos, a pledge at the University of Nevada at Reno, drowned in a lake participating in a hazing ritual. He and several pledges were told to swim in a lake in their underwear but Santos could not swim.
In 2012, Pi Kappa Alpha pledge David Bogenberger died of a cardiac arrhythmia triggered by alcohol poisoning. According to police, Bogenberger and other pledges at an unsanctioned Northern Illinois University event were pressured into drinking large quantities of alcohol in a two-hour time. Bogenberger and 18 other pledges drank to unconsciousness. Five fraternity officers and 17 other members were convicted of misdemeanors in one of the largest hazing prosecutions in U.S. history. The chapter was suspended by the fraternity.
In March 2015, the chapter at the University of South Carolina was suspended after a Pike member was found dead in a private home near campus that had beer kegs and St. Patrick Day decorations on the porch. The Richland County Coroner's Office called it a "suspicious death".
In March 2021, a student at Bowling Green State University died due to alleged hazing-related alcohol consumption at a party held by the BGSU chapter off-campus. The fraternity was permanently expelled a month later.

Sexual assault
Chapters have also been involved with sexual assault cases, such as in 1988, when three Pi Kappa Alpha members at Florida State University were charged in the sexual battery of a freshman female student. The victim was left in the hallway of another fraternity house. The case made national headlines for weeks.

Also in 1988 several members of Pi Kappa Alpha were arrested for a sexual assault that took place at Stetson University.

In 2008, 10 Pike members were arrested at Tulane University for pouring boiling hot water on pledges, with the chapter having also been accused of drugging and sexually assaulting several female students at the fraternity's annual bacchanal.

Florida International University suspended the fraternity in 2013 after the discovery of photos on Facebook of hazing and drug deals, as well as sexually explicit photos of women taken without their consent.

In 2015, the former fraternity chapter president at Utah State University was charged with forcible sexual abuse, a felony, after allegedly inappropriately touching a female fellow student passed out at a party.

Other incidents
Fraternity chapters have been involved in various other notable incidents. In 2014, the leaders of the University of Arkansas chapter were asked to resign following an unauthorized Martin Luther King, Jr. Day party that incorporated racist stereotypes. From 2014 to 2018, the fraternity lost its chapter at the University of Southern Mississippi following a hazing incident that led to the death of two mated flamingos. Pledges stole a flamingo from the local zoo, and in the struggle to defend its mate, the male was killed. The next morning, after being left on a bicycle path, the other died. In May 2017, the chapter at California State University, Chico was charged with illegally cutting down 32 trees in the Lassen National Forest during an initiation of new pledges.  They were also charged with possession of a firearm and conspiracy to commit offense or defraud the United States. In October 2017, the chapter was sentenced to 9,800 hours of community service and a $4,000 fine after pleading guilty to cutting down and damaging trees in the Lassen National Forest by the U.S. District Court. In 2021, seven members of the chapter at the University of Mississippi were arrested for harassing a former member who reported the chapter to authorities for hazing. As a result of a pledge who was told to ingest bleach, he was later diagnosed with Grade 4 severe erosive esophagitis. In 2022, the chapter at the University of Alabama (UA) was petitioned by students to be removed from campus. Students at UA petitioned the leadership of the university to kick the fraternity off campus due to compelling allegations of them "drugging young women" and abusing their pledges. It was cited in the petition that the national leadership of the fraternity removed several chapter members for misconduct but there has never been a positive change in the culture of the fraternity hence why they feel they should be deactivated on campus.

Delta Beta chapter criminal charges

In March 2021, fraternity pledge Stone Foltz was allegedly forced to consume a fifth of Evan Williams whiskey. He later died at the hospital due to alcohol intoxication.  Eight members of the Delta Beta Chapter at Bowling Green State University were criminally charged.  Charges included: first-degree felony involuntary manslaughter, reckless homicide, felonious assault, hazing, failure to comply with underage alcohol laws and obstructing official business, third-degree felony involuntary manslaughter, tampering with evidence, and obstructing justice.  It was described as a hazing incident involving copious alcohol consumption.  The international fraternity expelled all of the undergraduate members and revoked the chapter's charter.

List of Pi Kappa Alpha brothers

See also
List of social fraternities and sororities

References

External links
 

 
North American Interfraternity Conference
Student organizations established in 1868
1868 establishments in Virginia
Organizations based in Memphis, Tennessee